Labicymbium rusticulum is a species of sheet weaver found in Brazil. It was described by Keyserling in 1891.

References

Linyphiidae
Spiders of Brazil
Spiders described in 1891